Mozes Kilangin Airport  is an airport in Timika, Central Papua, Indonesia.

History
The airport was the site of a mass shooting that took place on 15 April 1996 by a member of Kopassus Sec. Lt. Sanurip. The shooting killed 16 people and injured 11 others.

On 18 July 2008, Minister of Transportation Jusman Syafii Djamal inaugurated upgrading of Mozes Kilangin Airport's status into an international airport.

On 9 October 2008, at around 10.00 a.m. WIT, Merpati Nusantara Airlines Flight MZ-835 experienced a tire burst while landing at Mozes Kilangin Airport as it was on its transit from Jayapura to Jakarta. No victims were injured in the incident.

Airlines and destinations

References

External links
 Mozes Kilangin Airport information on Ministry of Transportation

Airports in Central Papua
Buildings and structures in Timika